Stephen Swart (born Auckland, 5 January 1965) is a former New Zealand cyclist. He began his professional career with British team, ANC-Halfords and rode the 1987 Tour de France with them. After the ANC team folded later that year, he rode for American teams.

With the Motorola team, he participated in the 1994 and 1995 Tour de France. He won the Herald Sun Tour (Australia) and the Tour of Canada.

Swart's older brother, Jack, was a top amateur cyclist.

In the 1986 Commonwealth Games he competed in the 4000m team pursuit, the team came second for silver; and in the 4000m individual pursuit.

Doping and cheating revelations

Prompted by his son's taking up racing, Swart spoke up about doping in cycling. He described Lance Armstrong, his Motorola teammate, as one of the strongest advocates of doping when the team decided to dope.  “He was the instigator,” Swart told Sports Illustrated. “It was his words that pushed us toward doing it.”  Swart also described his own doping.

When he initially made his disclosures, he was vilified and called a loser. Later, in 2012, he was named the 'New Zealander of the Year' for having told the truth.

Swart also testified, under oath in 2006, that he was paid $50,000 to lose a race, by Armstrong.

Major results
1988
 8th Fleche Hesbignonne
 9th Grand Prix de Plumelec-Morbihan
1989
 7th Philly Cycling Classic
1991
 6th Thrift Drug Classic
1992
 1st  National Criterium Championships
 1st Stage 3 Tour of the Adirondacks
 2nd Overall Celestial Bicycle Classic 
1st Stages 1 & 2
 5th Overall Herald Sun Tour
1st Stages 10 & 11
1993
 1st Stage 11 Herald Sun Tour
1994
 9th Wincanton Classic
1995
 4th Overall Tour of Luxembourg

References

Sources

External links
 

New Zealand male cyclists
1965 births
Living people
Cyclists from Auckland
Commonwealth Games silver medallists for New Zealand
Cyclists at the 1986 Commonwealth Games
Commonwealth Games medallists in cycling
20th-century New Zealand people
Doping cases in cycling
New Zealand sportspeople in doping cases
Medallists at the 1986 Commonwealth Games